The 2011 Stockholm Ladies Cup was held from November 3 to 6 at the Danderyds Curling AB in Stockholm, Sweden as part of the 2011–12 World Curling Tour. The event was held in a triple-knockout format, and the playoffs were held in a modified double-knockout format. The purse for the event was 80,000 SEK, with the winner, Liudmila Privivkova, receiving 25,000 SEK.

Teams

Knockout results

A event

B event

C event

Playoffs qualifiers

A qualifiers

B qualifiers

Playoffs

External links

Stockholm Ladies Cup
2011 in Swedish women's sport
2011 in women's curling
2010s in Stockholm
November 2011 sports events in Europe